The 2018 6 Hours of Silverstone was an endurance sports car racing event held at the Silverstone Circuit in Northamptonshire, England on 17–19 August 2018. Silverstone served as the third round of the 2018-19 FIA World Endurance Championship, and was the seventh running of the event as part of the championship. The race was won by the #3 Rebellion R13, after the #8 and #7 TS050 Hybrids were disqualified due to excessive wear on their Skid Planks.

Qualifying

Qualifying Results
Pole position winners in each class are marked in bold.

Race 
Upon starting the Rebellion R-13s were caught out by the No. 17 SMP car, and also, contact in LMGTE Am caused carnage on the first lap, similar to the previous races. On lap 23, Aleshin's engine failed and the car retired. Shortly afterward, the No. 10 suffered a supposed suspension issue, as stated by Hanley. The No. 54 had an issue that tossed off the rear wing, bringing out a yellow. Binder was caught out by slowing LMP2 cars, causing him to spin. The car could not start and retired. Egor Orudzhev's No. 17 lost grip and made contact with Molina, and the No. 71 brought out the safety car for tire debris. The No. 71 ultimately finished second to last, because after the safety car period, the No. 95, from near the LMGTE Pro lead, had a brake repair.  The No. 82 had a suspension failure, forcing its retirement, and an FCY to recover it. Late in the race, Sarrazin stopped in the pit lane and had to be pushed to its box. The No. 7 ran wide at Stowe and got a puncture, and the No. 8 took the lead. Lotterer had an unstable rear end and came in for a rear wing change. In the final 30 minutes, the No. 92 of Christensen hit Priaulx's Ford, giving it a penalty even so on the road it was 3rd in class.

Post-Race 
In the post-race, the No. 91 Porsche GT was disqualified for low ride height, same being with both the Nos. 7 & 8 of Toyota, giving Thomas Laurent, Mathias Beche, and Gustavo Menezes the win with Rebellion Racing, the first for a non-hybrid since 2012, when Dumas, Gene, and Duval won in the Audi R18 ultra, and Laurent had the prize of youngest race winner. The podium was then a 1-2 for Rebellion followed by SMP No. 17. In LMP2, Richelmi, Aubry, and Tung won from Jafaar, Jeffri, and Tan, followed by the Le Mans class winners. The disqualification of Lietz/Bruni meant that the LMGTE Pro podium was Calado/ Pier Guidi followed by Priaulx/Tincknell, with Estre/Christensen in third. LMGTE Am, the Le Mans winners finished ahead of  TF Sport's Adam/Hankey/Eastwood, completing the podium was Perfetti/ Lindsey/Bergmeister in the "Bumblebee" Project 1.

Race Result 
The minimum number of laps for classification (70% of the overall winning car's race distance) was 135 laps. Class winners in bold.

Standings after the race

2018–2019 LMP World Endurance Drivers' Championship

2018–2019 LMP1 World Endurance Championship

 Note: Only the top five positions are included for the Drivers' Championship standings.

2018–2019 World Endurance GTE Drivers' Championship

2018–2019 World Endurance GTE Manufacturers' Championship

 Note: Only the top five positions are included for the Drivers' Championship standings.

References

External links 

 

Silverstone
Silverstone
6 Hours of Silverstone
RAC Tourist Trophy
August 2018 sports events in the United Kingdom